Cenometra is a genus of crinoids belonging to the family Colobometridae.

Species
Species within this genus include:
 Cenometra bella (Hartlaub, 1890) 
 Cenometra emendatrix (Bell, 1892)

References

Colobometridae
Crinoid genera